The native form of this personal name is Vidovszky László. This article uses the Western name order.

László Vidovszky (born Békéscsaba, Hungary, February 25, 1944) is a Hungarian composer and pianist.  During the 1970s he began composing works in a minimal style.

Vidovszky studied composition with Géza Szatmári at the Szeged Conservatory in 1959, and with Ferenc Farkas at the Budapest Academy of Music from 1962 to 1967.  In 1970–71, he studied in Paris, attending courses organized by the Groupe des Recherches Musicales as well as composition classes of Olivier Messiaen.

In 1970, Vidovszky co-founded (together with Zoltán Jeney, László Sáry, Péter Eötvös, and Albert Simon) the Budapest New Music Studio and has been an active member ever since, both as composer and as performer.

Vidovszky taught music theory at the Teachers’ Training College of the Budapest Academy of Music from 1972 to 1984.  In 1984 he was appointed director of the music department at the University of Pécs in southern Hungary, a position which he held until 1988.  In 1996 he was appointed as the first Dean of the recently founded Faculty of Fine and Performing Arts at the same university.

Vidovszky was awarded the Erkel Prize (1983), the Bartók-Pásztory Prize (1992) and the Kossuth Prize (2010). He was named Merited Artist of the Hungarian Republic in 1996.

Major works

2011 Reverb – piano and string quartet
2007 Páros – vln. and cello
2007 ASCH – string sextet
2005 The Death in my Viola – viola and chamber ensemble
2000 Zwölf Streichquartette – string quartet
1997 Black Quartet – covered perc. instruments
1995 Ady: Black Piano – disklavier and orchestra
1992 Music for the Hungarian Pavilion at Sevilla world Expo with Zoltán Jeney
1990 NaNe audio-video games – for Atari ST computer and synth
1989 Studies for MIDI piano
1989 Twelve Duos – vln. and viola
1981 Narcissus and Echo – opera in one act
1980 Sound-Colour-Space, with Ilona Keserü – 127 coloured pipes
1980 Encounter  – tragedy in one act, text by Péter Nádas
1975 Schroeder's Death – for piano and 2–3 assistants
1975 Hommage à Kurtág – collective work with Péter Eötvös, Zoltán Jeney, Zoltán Kocsis  and László Sáry
1974 Undisturbed – collective work with Zoltán Jeney and László Sáry
1972 Autokoncert – audiovisual work
1972 Kettős (Double) – 2 prepared pianos

References
 Tünde Szitha: László Vidovszky. Mágus Publishing, Budapest 2006.

External links
László Vidovszky page on Budapest Music Center website
Editio Musica Budapest

1944 births
20th-century classical composers
21st-century classical composers
Hungarian classical composers
Hungarian male classical composers
Living people
Postmodern composers
20th-century Hungarian male musicians
21st-century Hungarian male musicians